Edward Pole (1 September 1805 – 22 May 1890) was an English cricketer with amateur status. He was associated with Oxford University and made his first-class debut in 1827.

Pole was born at Barford St Martin, Wiltshire, where his father, also called Edward, was rector of the parish. He was educated at Exeter College, Oxford, then became a Church of England priest and was rector of Templeton, Devon, 1833–1879 and subsequently of Rackenford, Devon. He died at Tredis House, Sheviock, Cornwall, a home of the Pole family.

References

1805 births
1890 deaths
English cricketers
English cricketers of 1826 to 1863
Oxford University cricketers
Alumni of Exeter College, Oxford
19th-century English Anglican priests